Xylophanes mineti is a moth of the  family Sphingidae. It is known from Ecuador and Bolivia.

The wingspan is 84–87 mm. It is similar to Xylophanes crotonis, but of similar in size to Xylophanes sarae. The forewing is more slender and slightly more falcate than Xylophanes crotonis. The forewing upperside ground colour is greenish-brown (fading to reddish-brown). The first postmedian line is sometimes slightly duplicated, giving the impression of a supernumerary line.

Subspecies
Xylophanes mineti mineti
Xylophanes mineti boliviana Haxaire & Vaglia, 2004 (Bolivia)

References

mineti
Moths described in 2004